Ashboro is an unincorporated community in Sugar Ridge Township, Clay County, Indiana. It is part of the Terre Haute Metropolitan Statistical Area.

History
Ashboro was founded in 1858. It was named after Asheboro, North Carolina.

A post office was established at Ashboro in 1858, and remained in operation until it was discontinued in 1918. The post office was officially spelled Ashborough in early years.

Geography

References

Unincorporated communities in Clay County, Indiana
Unincorporated communities in Indiana
Terre Haute metropolitan area